Terry Dixon (born 29 July 1966) is a Jamaican boxer. He competed in the men's light heavyweight event at the 1988 Summer Olympics.

References

External links
 

1966 births
Living people
Light-heavyweight boxers
English male boxers
Jamaican male boxers
Olympic boxers of Jamaica
Boxers at the 1988 Summer Olympics
Boxers from Greater London
English people of Jamaican descent